Hoodoo Glacier is a glacier in northwestern British Columbia, Canada, located on the western flank of Hoodoo Mountain. It lies at the headwaters of the Hoodoo River. The glacier originates from the Andrei Icefield.

See also
List of glaciers in Canada
Twin Glacier

References

External links

Glaciers of British Columbia
Cassiar Land District
Boundary Ranges